The Islamic State in Somalia (short: ISS) or Abnaa ul-Calipha is an Islamic State–affiliated group that primarily operates in the mountainous areas of Puntland, though has also claimed responsibility for several terrorist attacks throughout the rest of Somalia. Led by Sheikh Abdul Qadir Mumin, the group is estimated to have up to 300 active fighters. Since its formation, ISS probably managed to take control of a small, sparsely populated territory in northern Somalia's mountainous hinterland, though it was not acknowledged as official province ("Wilayat") by IS's central leadership until December 2017. Since then, it has sometimes been called Somalia Province ("Wilayat al Somal") by pro-IS media. ISS is also the declared enemy of al-Shabaab, which considers the Islamic State a significant threat to its own predominance among Jihadist factions in Somalia.

History

Origins and formation 

The origins of the Islamic State in Somalia trace back to 2012, when Abdul Qadir Mumin was sent by the al-Shabaab leadership to its remote outpost in Puntland, far from the insurgent group's primary areas of operation in southern Somalia. As cleric with little military experience, Mumin's role in Puntland was originally to attract recruits for the numerical small and militarily weak local al-Shabaab group, which was led by Mohamed Said Atom at the time. In course of the Galgala campaign in 2014, however, Atom defected to the government, and Mumin was forced to take control of the Puntland group. Isolated in the remote north and feeling increasingly distanced from al-Shabaab, Mumin began to consider himself more and more independent.

Meanwhile, the Islamic State of Iraq and the Levant had launched a propaganda campaign to convince al-Shabaab to join to them, which was "angrily refused" by al-Shabaab's central leadership. Despite this, several groups of al-Shabaab members found IS's ideology attractive or saw this new Jihadist organization as a way to challenge al-Shabaab's leadership at the time. Thus, several small pro-IS groups emerged in southern Somalia. This was however not tolerated by the Somali organization, which released statements condemning dissenters and ordered its internal security service Amniyat to arrest or kill pro-IS elements such as Hussein Abdi Gedi's faction in Middle Juba.

Mumin, however, long dissatisfied with his situation, pledged bay'ah to Abu Bakr al-Baghdadi and the Islamic State in October 2015. This caused a violent split within Puntland's al-Shabaab, as only 20 of the 300 local Islamist fighters joined Mumin, while the al-Shabaab loyalists attempted to kill these defectors. Mumin's small group proceeded to form Abnaa ul-Calipha, better known as Islamic State in Somalia, and to evade their erstwhile comrades, while recruiting new members for their cause. Al-Baghdadi and the IS leadership did not acknowledge Mumin's bay'ah, instead choosing to wait and see how the Islamic State in Somalia fared. While Mumin's group in the north thus managed to survive, the situation of pro-IS forces in southern Somalia consequently became even more precarious. In two notable incidents in November and December 2015, al-Shabaab attacked and destroyed two of the most important southern IS cells, namely the ones of Bashir Abu Numan and Mohammad Makkawi Ibrahim. Pro-government forces such as the Somali Armed Forces and Ahlu Sunna Waljama'a also claimed to have targeted southern IS groups. As result, IS forces in southern Somalia remained very weak, and those that survived appear to have accepted Mumin's authority over time, formally becoming part of ISS. As result, the "disparate clump of pro-Islamic State cells" in Somalia transformed into an "organized group".

Rise in power and Qandala campaign 

In March 2016, an ISS cell in southern Puntland was pursued by al-Shabaab fighters into Mudug; the pursuers were however attacked and completely defeated by the Puntland Dervish Force and Galmudug soldiers, thus unintentionally allowing the Islamic State militants to escape into safety. From this point onwards, ISS and al-Shabaab temporarily ceased fighting each other with the exception of some isolated incidents. Over the following months Mumin's followers built up their strength, and by April 2016 they had set up a temporary training camp named after Bashir Abu Numan, the IS follower mentioned above who had been killed by al-Shabaab in November 2015. In one of the group's propaganda videos, Mumin blessed the makeshift base as the "first camp of the Caliphate in Somalia". On 25 April, ISS also carried out its first attack on government forces, when one of its fighters detonated an IED against an AMISOM vehicle in Mogadishu. By August 2016, Mumin's cell still remained very small, probably under 100 militants, and was not yet very active. According to the United States Department of State, however, ISS began to expand in size by abducting and indoctrinating boys between 10 and 15 and employing them as child soldiers.

By October 2016, ISS had claimed less than one dozen attacks overall since its foundation, showing that the group was still relatively weak. Nevertheless, the fact that many of these strikes had taken place in Mogadishu, indicated that ISS had become able to operate throughout wider Somalia, not just in its core regions in Puntland. Experts also estimated that Mumin's cell had significantly grown to up to 300 fighters. On 26 October, the group eventually launched their first major operation by targeting the major port town of Qandala. The town had both symbolic as well as strategic significance, as it could allow ISS to bolster their local support and receive more supplies from Yemen. The Islamic State fighters managed to overrun the town, meeting little resistance, and thereafter controlled it largely unchallenged until 3 December. On that day, the Puntland Security Force launched a counter-offensive, and after sporadic fighting for four days, retook Qandala on 7 December 2016. Mumin's men were forced to retreat to El Ladid, a village 30 kilometers south of Qandala, where government forces once again attacked and scattered them on 18 December. Overall, ISS suffered numerous casualties during the Qandala campaign, but had scored a symbolic victory nonetheless, having captured and held a major town for more than a month. Having established a new headquarters in the al-Mishkat Mountains, ISS subsequently managed to attract new recruits, mostly children and orphans, though also some new defectors from al-Shabaab. It also became generally more active.

Expanded terrorist attacks and announcement of Wilayat al Somal 

The Qandala campaign resulted in the Puntland government as well as the African Union taking ISS more seriously, with both taking more steps to counter ISS' growing strength. In addition, ISS began to cooperate with al-Shabaab to a limited degree during the subsequent months. On 8 February 2017, ISS launched its next major attack in Puntland, with several militants of the group attacking the Village Hotel in Bosaso. A fierce shootout ensued, with the hotel's guards eventually repelling the attackers. At least four guards and two ISS fighters died during the fighting. On 28 March 2017, ISS ambushed a convoy of Puntland soldiers near Qandala. The attackers retreated into the hills after inflicting two casualties on the government forces. On 16 April, the group occupied Dasan village near Qandala, though abandoned it again after a few hours. ISS was also blamed for a roadside bomb in Galgala on 23 April that killed 8 soldiers and injured 3 others. On 23 May 2017, ISS carried out a suicide bombing, which was possibly the group's very first suicide attack. When the ISS suicide bomber tried to close in on the Juba Hotel in Bosaso, he was stopped at a military checkpoint, causing him to detonate his explosives, killing five and wounding twelve.

In June 2017, a Puntland military official claimed that ISS had been reduced to around 70 active fighters, and sustained itself by stealing food and livestock from local communities. Regional expert Matthew Bryden, on the other side, said that ISS still had up to 300 fighters and had become entrenched in the eastern Galgala mountains, where it had gained the support of some local communities which felt ignored by the government. Observers also noted that ISS had significantly increased their output of propaganda material in an attempt to sway disenfranchised locals and international jihadists to their side. By late 2017, the United Nations estimated that Mumin's group was about 200 fighters strong.

In November 2017, the United States launched their first airstrikes on ISS, reportedly killing several members of the group in Buqo Valley, east of Bosaso. They failed to kill Mumin, however, who had been the main target of the bombings. Observers noted that these airstrikes indicated that the US military had come to see ISS as considerable threat to the stability of the region. On 25 December, IS released an anti-Christian propaganda video under the name "Hunt Them Down, O Monotheists", in which the Islamic State in Somalia was called Wilayat al Somal (Somalia Province), thus seemingly elevating the group to an official province of the proclaimed worldwide caliphate of IS. Since then, however, the new name has not been consistently applied to the group by pro-IS media.

Reignited rivalry with al-Shabaab 

Meanwhile, ISS started to launch assassination attempts in the region around Mogadishu from November 2017, with the town Afgooye most affected. From then on, the group greatly increased its rate of attacks on government targets. By May 2018, ISS had reportedly carried out eleven attacks and killed 23 people who had allegedly worked for the government, such as intelligence agents, soldiers, officials, and policemen. In response to these assaults, the National Intelligence and Security Agency started to arrest suspected ISS members in and around Mogadishu. ISS also abducted nine people in the region around Qandala in January 2018, including some off-duty soldiers. The militia later tortured and decapitated at least three of them, leaving them along a road to be found by passersby. At the end of 2018, ISS claimed to have carried out 66 attacks, more than in 2016 and 2017 combined.

The group also grew more sophisticated and further expanded its presence throughout Somalia. It had begun to collect taxes (essentially protection money) on businesses in Bosaso by August 2018, greatly increasing its revenue. At some point in 2018, ISS managed to convince a significant number of al-Shabaab militants to defect, resulting in the formation of an Islamic State cell in Beledweyne. As result of its increasing activity in central and southern Somalia, the rivalry between ISS and al-Shabaab reignited in full, with several clashes occurring between the groups. In October 2018, al-Shabaab probably executed ISS deputy, Mahad Maalin in Mogadishu, while Islamic State forces ambushed an al-Shabaab group near B'ir Mirali southwest of Qandala, reportedly killing 14 rival militants. The growing violence between the two jihadist rebel factions resulted in al-Shabaab central command releasing a speech as well as an 18-page treatise on 20 December 2018. In these works, the Islamic State  was sharply rebuked as corrupt, apostate, and seditionist force, while al-Shabaab authorized its loyalists to destroy ISS elements as "disease in the Jihad". This amounted to an official declaration of war.

In the next months, the two factions greatly increased their attacks against each other: They clashed near El Adde in December 2018, and at numerous locations in Puntland between January and March 2019. ISS reportedly suffered one major setback during these clashes when it lost one of its main bases in the Dasaan area to al-Shabaab. Regardless, neither organizations appears to have suffered to a tangible degree from this inter-rebel fighting, and both have continued to strike government targets. The United States Air Force carried out an airstrike against ISS on 14 April 2019, killing its deputy Abdihakim Mohamed Ibrahim at Xiriiro, Bari region. On 12 July 2019, ISS militants clashed with security forces near the Safa hotel in Puntland's capital, Bosaso, the same day as an al-Shabaab attack on a hotel in Kismayo. The United States Air Force bombed an ISS base in the Golis Mountains on 8 May 2019, reportedly killing 13 militants.

On 27 October 2019, IS Caliph Abu Bakr al-Baghdadi was killed in the Barisha raid, whereupon the organisation's central command elected Abu Ibrahim al-Hashimi al-Qurashi as new leader. On 4 November, the Islamic State in Somalia officially pledged allegiance to al-Qurashi. By this time, ISS was regarded as important element in IS's international network, but still suffered from an inability to expand due to pressure by  al-Shabaab, the Somali Armed Forces, and the United States Armed Forces. From late 2019, the group consequently attempted to become more active beyond Somalia's borders, as its forces tried to infiltrate Ethiopia and recruit new forces there. Its operations in Ethiopia were repeatedly crushed by local security forces, and several militants were arrested. ISS had also set up a new training camp, codenamed "Dawoud al Somali", probably in northern Puntland.

In course of 2020's first half, ISS gradually increased the number of its attacks, while its troops evicted al-Shabaab from the contested area around Dasaan, Mudug region. At the same time, it suffered several setbacks. The Puntland Security Forces destroyed several ISS cells in and around Bosaso, hampering the group's ability to operate in the north. ISS' uptick in activity was consequently focused on southern Somalia, mostly Mogadishu. In July, the Puntland Security Forces launched an offensive against ISS south of Bosaso. Supported by the United States Armed Forces, the Puntland troops reportedly inflicted heavy casualties on the Islamic State militants, although the insurgents claimed to have eventually repelled the attack.

Organisation 

The Islamic State in Somalia is led by Abdul Qadir Mumin, whose role in the continued existence of the group has been judged to be extremely important. Described as "eloquent and persuasive, [...] very savvy and sophisticated", Mumin is deeply involved in international jihadism and considered to be an extremely dangerous terrorist leader. After reports circulated in June/July 2017 that Abu Bakr al-Baghdadi had been killed, terror expert Candyce Kelshall even speculated that Mumin might be tempted to declare himself the new caliph of IS. Mumin's direct control is however limited to ISS forces in northern Somalia. Though pro-IS cells in the southern parts of the country have probably accepted Mumin as their official leader, the exact relationship between the northern and southern groups of ISS remains unclear. It is possible that the latter only have nominal links to the northern branch or no actual contact at all. In any case, the southern cells remain mostly weak and exist in a precarious state, constantly threatened by al-Shabaab.

Besides Mumin, two other ISS commanders were known: Mahad Maalin served as field commander and deputy of the group until his death in October 2018. He was succeeded as deputy by Abdihakim Mohamed Ibrahim, alias "Dhoqob", who was believed to be Mumin's "right-hand man". Dhoqob was killed on 14 April 2019, and his death was portrayed by the United States Africa Command as major blow to ISS.

Though it is probable that ISS controls a relatively small territory in Puntland's mountainous hinterland, the group is not known to have attempted to set up something resembling a government at any point of its existence. ISS' current areas are only very sparsely settled or not populated at all, while Qandala's civilian population completely fled during its occupation by the militants. By November 2019, ISS controlled the villages of Dasaan and Shebaab in Bari region. The group is known to use caves as hiding places.

Military strength 
The strength of the Islamic State in Somalia fluctuated over time, and is not known with certainty. Mumin's initial cell was estimated at 20 members, growing to less than 100 by August 2016. At the time of the Qandala campaign, a former Puntland Intelligence Agency official argued that ISS counted 200 to 300 militants. Following its defeat at Qandala, local observers judged that the group declined to just 70–150 members by June 2017. The Islamic State in Somalia subsequently recruited new fighters to alleviate its manpower shortage, though Somali journalists gave widely different accounts on the success of this recruitment drive. Accordingly, ISS was believed to be between 100 and 300 militants strong by mid-2018. The vast majority of ISS members are Somalis, with only a few foreign mujahideen fighting for the group, including Sudanese, Yemenis, Ethiopians, Egyptians, Djiboutis, and at least one Canadian.

Propaganda 
The propaganda of ISS is generally extremely inferior compared to its direct rival al-Shabaab. The Islamic State in Somalia initially had no media wing of its own and also has not organized a "robust informal media presence". Instead, it mostly relies on the existing propaganda channels of IS, such as the Amaq News Agency, the Al Naba newsletter , the Global Front to Support the Islamic State, and the media arms of other IS branches in Iraq, Syria, Yemen, Egypt, and Libya. The propaganda video of December 2017 that declared ISS a province, however, also claimed to have been produced by the "Media Office of Wilayat al Somal". In late 2019, ISS began releasing propaganda in Amharic, a language widely spoken in Ethiopia, in an attempt to attract new recruits there. Besides eulogizing dead fighters and emphasizing ISS' military capabilities, the group's propaganda also employs other common tropes of Islamic State propaganda such as portraying the rebel-held areas as "paradise".

Supply, support and allies 

In its endeavor to build up its military strength, the Islamic State in Somalia is aided by the fact that Puntland's government has only limited control over its hinterland while its military is overstrechted. Peripheral areas are thus mostly ignored by the security forces and instead run by rebellious and infighting tribal militias. As result, local clans (including Mumin's own, the Majeerteen Ali Saleban) are aggrieved by their perceived marginalisation by the government and in some cases ready to support ISS. Such dissatisfied elements are the ones from which ISS receives supplies and recruits new members. There have also been accounts, however, that ISS raids those communities which do not supply it with food and other necessities, and to kidnap children in order to indoctrinate and train them as child soldiers. The group is also known to collect taxes in areas which it controls or at least influences.

The group is also directly supported by the Islamic State of Iraq and the Levant – Yemen Province, which is known to have sent experts, trainers, money, weapons and other materials to ISS. The United Nations also claimed in November 2017 that ISS receives direct assistance from IS officials in Syria and Iraq. In smuggling fighters and supplies across the Gulf of Aden, ISS works closely with Somali pirates, namely Mohamed Garfanje's Hobyo-Haradhere Piracy Network and another unidentified group that is based in Qandala. These pirates do, however, also supply ISS' rival in Puntland, al-Shabaab, with weapons and other materials.

Furthermore, ISS has been supported by "financial operative" Mohamed Mire Ali Yusuf (often simply called Mire Ali) who provided the group with money and supplies through two companies, both located in Bosaso by 2016: Liibaan Trading, a livestock trading business, and Al-Mutafaq Commercial Company. The United States Department of the Treasury designated Mire as terrorist and sanctioned his two businesses in February 2018.

Alleged state support 

According to a New York Times report, Qatar may have financed and directed an Islamic State attack in Puntland on 10 May in order to pressure the United Arab Emirates to end development of a port in Bosaso and to have the contract replaced with Qatar. An influential Qatari businessman named Khalifa al-Muhannadi reportedly claimed Qatari involvement in the attack in a phone call to Qatar's ambassador to the Federal Government of Somalia. Neither Muhannadi nor the ambassador denied the phone call took place, but Qatar claimed al-Muhannadi acted independently while also criticizing the report.

Notes

References

Works cited 

 
 
 
 
 
 

Factions of the Islamic State of Iraq and the Levant
Somali Civil War (2009–present)
Organizations based in Africa designated as terrorist
Guerrilla organizations
Rebel groups in Somalia
Islamic terrorism in Somalia
Jihadist groups
Factions in the Somali Civil War